

Mobile reserve divisions

221st division

222nd division

224th division

225th division

229th division

230th division

231st division

234th division

Coastal defense divisions

303rd division

308th division

312th division

316th division

320th division

The 320th division has completed organization 25 July 1945 in Daegu, performing a police duties from Daegu to Seoul. After the start of the Soviet invasion of Manchuria 9 August 1945, the 320th division was ordered to move north to Wonsan, but did not complete the move due to the surrender of Japan 15 August 1945.

Notes
This section incorporates material from Japanese Wikipedia page 第320師団 (日本軍), accessed 22 July 2016

321st division

322nd division

344th division

351st division

354th division

355th division

See also
 List of Japanese Infantry Divisions

Notes and references
This article incorporates material from Japanese Wikipedia page 本土決戦第三次兵備, accessed 20 July 2016
 Madej, W. Victor, Japanese Armed Forces Order of Battle, 1937–1945 [2 vols], Allentown, PA: 1981.

Infantry divisions of Japan
Military units and formations established in 1945
Military units and formations disestablished in 1945
1945 establishments in Japan
1945 disestablishments in Japan
Japanese military-related lists
Army Divisions